Globularia cordifolia, the heart-leaved globe daisy, is a species of flowering plant in the family Plantaginaceae, native to the mountains of central and southern Europe, and western Turkey.

In cultivation it requires the open aspect, full sun and sharp drainage of its native habitat, and is best grown in an alpine garden.

The Latin specific epithet cordifolia means “with heart-shaped leaves”. 

This plant has gained the Royal Horticultural Society's Award of Garden Merit.

References

 

cordifolia
Flora of Turkey
Plants described in 1753
Taxa named by Carl Linnaeus